Mecayapan is a municipality and city in Veracruz, Mexico. It is located in south-east zone of the State of Veracruz, about 428 km from state capital Xalapa. It has a surface of 523.96 km2.

The municipality of  Mecayapan  is delimited to the north by Gulf of Mexico to the east by Pajapan, to the south by Chinameca and to the west by Soteapan State.

Economy 

It produces principally maize, beans and green chile.

Climate 

The weather in Mecayapan is warm all year with rains in summer and autumn.

Culture 

In Mecayapan, the celebration in honor to Santo Santiago Jacobo, the patron saint of the town, is held every May.

References

External links 
 Mecyapan Tourist Guide
  Municipal Official webpage
  Municipal Official Information

Municipalities of Veracruz
Los Tuxtlas